Beverly Depot is an MBTA Commuter Rail station in Beverly, Massachusetts. Located in Downtown Beverly, it serves the Newburyport/Rockport Line. It is the junction of the line's two branches to Newburyport and Rockport and is served by every train on both branches.

The Eastern Railroad was extended through Beverly to Ipswich in 1839. The 1839 station was replaced in 1855; that station was in turn replaced by one designed by Bradford Lee Gilbert in 1897. The station was listed on the National Register of Historic Places in 1979, and is a contributing property of the Beverly Depot-Odell Park Historic District which was added in 2014. A 500-space parking garage at Beverly opened on August 2, 2014.

History

The Eastern Railroad was extended from Salem to Ipswich via Beverly on December 18, 1839. One of the difficulties in constructing the extension was blasting a -long cut through a ridge near School Street in Beverly. The Beverly station, a low wooden structure, was located at the north end of the Essex Bridge in the town's developed southern tip. The Gloucester Branch opened from Beverly to Manchester on August 3, 1847, and to Gloucester on December 1. 

As the population of Gloucester grew, development spread northwards along Cabot Street. Rantoul Street was laid out in 1851 parallel to the Eastern Railroad. The 1839-built depot may have been moved north near Rantoul Street in 1852.

Its 1855 replacement was a larger wooden building with a train shed at the modern site. In 1890, a local citizens group hired Charles Eliot to design improvements to the station grounds. The work was paid for by the private group, as the railroad refused to contribute other than donating some labor and materials. The train shed was torn down for the 1897 construction of the Bradford Lee Gilbert station that still stands. A copy was built ten years later at Andover.

The ticket office closed in 1965 with passenger traffic in free fall as the newly formed MBTA began to subsidize service to Beverly. The station building was sold soon after, and was converted to an antique store by 1968. It partially burned on February 15, 1971, but was renovated and reopened as a restaurant by that December. The building was listed on the National Register of Historic Places in 1979.  The modern station facilities, located adjacent to the depot building, consist of two platforms serving the line's two tracks. Short high-level platforms are located on the outbound end of the longer low-level platforms, making the station accessible.

On November 16, 1984, the Beverly Bridge, which carried the line between Salem and Beverly, was destroyed by a fire. For 13 months, Beverly was the connection point between a Salem-Beverly-Ipswich shuttle bus and a Beverly-Rockport shuttle train. Regular service over a new bridge was restored on December 1, 1985.

Garage

In April 2007, the MBTA announced plans to expand the parking lot and replace the mini-high platforms, with a garage to be added later. However, in June 2008, then-governor Deval Patrick announced plans to build the parking garage. In June 2009, the MBTA chose a site one block south of the station. As part of environmental mitigation for increased urban auto traffic enabled by the Big Dig, the state was required to add 1,000 parking spaces to MBTA stations by the end of 2011.

On September 15, 2012, the MBTA approved $25 million in funding for the new parking garage. The three-story, 500-space garage more than quintupled former parking capacity and includes facilities such as electric car charging stations and roof-mounted solar panels as well as a covered walkway leading over Pleasant Street to the station platforms. The $34.1 million project began construction in February 2013 after several months of delays. The garage was originally planned to open in December 2013, but the opening was delayed several times due to construction difficulties. A retaining wall required additional reinforcement, unusually cold winter temperatures prevented contractors from pouring concrete, and contaminated soil had to be unexpectedly brought to out-of-state disposal locations when in-state facilities closed. The city of Beverly contributed $500,000 in city funds to cover additional construction costs from these delays. 

The garage ultimately opened on August 2, 2014. After four weeks, only 100 of the 500 spaces were being used on a daily basis. By September 2015, usage averaged 260 cars on weekdays. On April 3, 2017, the pedestrian bridge linking the garage and station was damaged by an oversized load on a flatbed truck.

Design work for improvements to the accessible mini-high platforms began in 2021. The MBTA plans to use the station as the first test site for a freestanding temporary accessible platform design; if successful, the design would then be used at currently-inaccessible stations. A $300k improvement to a tail track north of the station, intended to allow more frequent Boston–Beverly short turn service, is planned to be completed in late 2022.

References

Notes

External links

MBTA – Beverly
Station on Google Maps Street View

MBTA Commuter Rail stations in Essex County, Massachusetts
Buildings and structures in Beverly, Massachusetts
Railway stations in the United States opened in 1897
Stations along Boston and Maine Railroad lines
National Register of Historic Places in Essex County, Massachusetts